Joseph Bryant Crockett (November 17, 1808 – January 15, 1884) was an American attorney who served as an associate justice of the Supreme Court of California from December 1867 to January 5, 1880.

Biography
Crockett was born in Lexington, Kentucky to Martha Ferguson and Robert Crockett. In 1827, he entered the University of Tennessee at Nashville, but stayed less than one year due to the expense. At the age of 19, he moved to Hopkinsville, Kentucky, and read law in the offices of Charles S. Morehead. In 1830, he formed a partnership of Henry & Crockett, and with the departure of his partner after two years he took over the practice. In August 1833, Crockett was elected to the Kentucky House of Representatives from Christian County. In 1836, he formed a firm with a young attorney, James F. Buckner, in the partnership of Crockett & Buckner, where he was joined by his brother, John W. Crockett. In 1840, Crockett moved to St. Louis, Missouri, where he edited a newspaper, the Intelligencer, and continued to practice law. In 1850, he ran under the Whig Party for the Missouri House of Representatives.

In 1852, he joined with Gwin Page, a fellow pupil from Morehead's law office, to come to San Francisco, California. They formed a law partnership, and Crockett continued his involvement in Democratic Party politics. In 1864, Crockett ran for the United States House of Representatives in California's 1st congressional district on the Democratic Party ticket, but lost to Republican Donald C. McRuer. After Page's death in 1857, Crockett formed the firm of Crockett & Whiting, and was joined in 1867 by Joseph Naphtally as a name partner.

In December 1868, Governor Henry Huntly Haight appointed Crockett as Associate Justice of the California Supreme Court to fill the vacancy left the resignation of Oscar L. Shafter. In October 1869, Crockett ran against William T. Wallace and Lorenzo Sawyer and was elected for the remainder of Shafter's term. In 1879, a constitutional convention was held, and a new constitution was adopted that called for elections for all seats of the Supreme Court. Crockett did not run in the September 1879 election.

On January 15, 1884, Crockett died at his home in Fruitvale, California.

Clubs
Crockett was a member of the Bohemian Club.

Personal life
On November 15, 1832, Crockett married Caroline Matilda Bryan in Hopkinsville, Kentucky, and they had eight children.

References

External links
 California Supreme Court Historical Society page on Joseph B. Crockett
 Past & Present Justices. California State Courts. Retrieved July 19, 2017.

See also
 List of justices of the Supreme Court of California
 Augustus Rhodes
 Silas Sanderson
 Lorenzo Sawyer
 Royal Sprague

1808 births
1884 deaths
People from Lexington, Kentucky
19th-century American lawyers
19th-century American judges
Justices of the Supreme Court of California
Superior court judges in the United States
U.S. state supreme court judges admitted to the practice of law by reading law
Lawyers from San Francisco
California Democrats
Members of the Kentucky House of Representatives
Lawyers from St. Louis
19th-century American politicians